Iran participated in the seventh Winter Paralympics in Nagano, Japan.

Competitors

Results by event

Alpine skiing 

Men

External links
International Paralympic Committee

1998
Nations at the 1998 Winter Paralympics
Winter Paralympics